The Cambridge Building Society is a UK mutual building society based in Cambridge, Cambridgeshire, England.  It is the 13th largest in the United Kingdom based on total assets of £1,586 million at 31 December 2019. It is a member of the Building Societies Association. It was formed in 1850 as the Cambridgeshire Permanent Benefit Building Society, adopting its current name in 1945.

There is no connection between the Cambridge Building Society and the Cambridge Foresters’ Benefit Building Society which was dissolved in 1960 or the Cambridge Peers Economic Building Society which was dissolved in 1972.

History 
Having been established in 1850, the society was based at 6 Post Office Terrace in Cambridge from 1884 until 1967 when it moved to new offices at 32 St. Andrews Street. Ten years after the move the first sub-branch opened in Mill Road.

In 1979 the society's assets reached £50 million and in the following years from 1980 to 1984 another four branches were opened.

By 1984 assets had reached £100 million. From 1985 to 1991 another six sub-branches were opened, and more savings products were launched. By 1991 assets had reached £250 million.

In the rest of the 1990s agency offices became full service branches, and another five branches opened.  The society started to offer an increased range of products and moved to the present Head Office accommodation. By 2000 assets had reached £500 million.

2016 saw a number of changes to its branch network.

In 2017 the society announced a £15m investment partnership with The Cambridgeshire County Council Pension Fund through the issuance of Core Capital Deferred Shares – the second building society to do so after Nationwide.

In 2017 the society launched an app for savings and mortgage customers

In 2018 the society announced a new programme 'Making The Difference' aimed at First Time Buyers.

In March 2020 the society expanded its lending area, and now lends across England and Wales

Products and Services 
The Cambridge Building Society offers a range of fixed and variable rate mortgages, on properties located in England and Wales.

Other products and services available through The Cambridge Building Society include savings, (business and council savings), home insurance and travel money.

The products and services from the society can be managed through their branches, their telephone contact centre and online through their website and their app.

Financial performance 
In 2019 The Cambridge Building Society reported gross lending of £295m and mortgage book growth of 8%. Assets as at 31 December totalled £1.586 billion and profit after tax reached £3.6 million. General reserves were stable at £87.3 million.

In 2018 The Cambridge reported a pre-tax profit of £3.2 million and in 2017 £3.8m.

Branch changes 
Following the society's announcement of a three-year investment programme in 2016, in June of that year it closed five branches (in the villages of Burwell, Soham and Milton and on Mill Road and Chesterton Road in Cambridge) of the 18 branches then operational. Five members of staff were deployed elsewhere within the society.  The society also introduced digital technology into two branches.

There are currently 12 branches all within a 20-mile radius of Cambridge.

In 2018 a new branch opened in Central Cambridge

In 2019 the Great Shelford branch was refurbished

In 2019 the Ely branch was refurbished

References

Building societies of England
Banks established in 1850
Companies based in Cambridge